Karakol culture ( Karakol'skaya kul'tura) is a Bronze Age archaeological culture of the 2nd millennium BCE in the Altai area, contemporaneous with the Afanasiev culture. Karakol culture was discovered in 1985 near village of Karakol in Altai. In the Altai territory, the Bronze Age extended from the 3rd to the 2nd millennium BCE, bronze was a main material for tools, weapons and jewelry. At that time in the Altai territory lived people of the Karakol and Afanasiev cultures. Most of the investigated Karakol culture burials are located on the banks of the river Ursul and its tributaries.

Economy
In the Bronze Age, Altai populations transitioned from hunter-gathering to productive economy, from the hunting, plants-gathering and fishing to livestock-breeding and agriculture. The early Altaians in the summer grazed herds of cows, horses, and flocks of sheep and goats on alpine meadows, in the winter they were coming back to the river valleys; they also cultivated fields and grew millet, barley, rye, and other cereal plants.

Archeology
Burials were in kurgans with circular enclosures, some burials in stone boxes, and ground grave-pits enclosed with massive stone slabs. Grave inventory is found infrequently. People were buried in rectangular boxes of hewn stone slabs, with many slabs with round hollows or holes and decorated with drawings of colored mineral pigments on inner side. Deceased were laid head to the west, facing the east. Coloured pictures in red, black, and white depict anthropomorphous creatures with feather crowns or with horns, with anthropomorphous masks and with costumes and sleeve ornaments. The pictures of birds, goats, elks, and people were made by cutting point technique. According to researchers, depicted animals and fantastic creatures on the inner side of the slabs "carried" the deceased to the afterlife. One of the figures depicted a man with a dog's head. 

The stone vaults of Karakol culture contain coals and ashes. This element of the spiritual and religious culture is preserved in the Altai Mountains to this day. The modern Altaian ritual practices include fire for ritual cleansing.

Genetic composition
Results of correlation between traditional anthropological group-differentiating complex of craniometrical and odontological traits with the markers of mitochondrial DNA were presented in the Professorial dissertation of T.A. Chikisheva, 2010.

Ethnicity 
Samoyedic peoples

References

Literature
 Kubarev V.D. "Ancient paintings of Karakol", Novosibirsk: Science, 1988 (In Russian)
 Molodin V.I. "Karakol Culture"//Materiaals on Okunev 2 culture and its surroundings, St. Petersburg: Elexis Print, 2006 (In Russian)
  Molodin V.I., Romashchenko A.G., Voivod M.I., Sitnikov V.V., Chikisheva T. "Paleogenetic analysis of the Siberia population gene pool"//Integral Program for Basic Research, Novosibirsk: Siberian Branch of RAS, 1998
 Chikisheva T.A., "Dynamics of anthropological differentiation in population of southern Western Siberia in Neolithic – Early Iron Age", Professorial dissertation, Novosibirsk, 2010, section Conclusions (In Russian)

Archaeological cultures of Central Asia
Archaeological cultures of Northern Asia
Archaeological cultures of Siberia
Turkic archeological cultures
Archaeological cultures in Kazakhstan
Archaeological cultures in Russia